Raymond William "Bill" Bradford (September 20, 1947 – December 8, 2005), who used R. W. Bradford as his pen name, was an American writer chiefly known for editing, publishing, and writing for the libertarian magazine Liberty.

Early life
Bradford was born on September 20, 1947, in Detroit, Michigan. He was the son of Raymond Bradford and Eleanor Ritter Bradford.

He edited his first periodical, a short-lived mimeographed zine called Eleutherian Forum, while a teenager.

During the 1970s he developed a prosperous precious metals and numismatic business in Lansing, Michigan, Liberty Coin Service. He partially retired in 1980, moving to Port Townsend, Washington with his wife.

Liberty magazine
For Liberty, which he started in 1987, he wrote under his own name as well as several pseudonyms: as "Chester Alan Arthur" he engaged in political reportage and commentary, and as "Ethan O. Waters" he wrote deliberately provocative philosophical criticism and essays. ("Ethan O. Waters" was an anagram for "Owen Hatteras", a pseudonym used by H. L. Mencken, a writer and editor much admired by Bradford.) Liberty magazine has been one of the longest-running libertarian journals ever published, and along with Reason magazine can be considered a giant in libertarian media.

Bradford was a consequentialist who favored a pragmatic approach to libertarian philosophy, grounding his limited government beliefs in a view of individual rights as social constructs, rather than a result of natural law. This approach differentiated Bradford from many other libertarian writers, as well as Ayn Rand. Bradford, however, was extremely tolerant of differences of opinion, and often published articles and essays by those with whom he disagreed; despite being against the war machine and opposed to the Iraq War, Bradford published articles written by proponents of the war. Many libertarian writers found a home at Liberty magazine, and the monthly continues to be edited and published by his good friend, Stephen Cox, and Bradford's widow, Kathy.

In later years, Bradford became notable for his published criticisms of the Libertarian Party, whom he viewed as excessively didactic and electorally ineffective. He also reported upon what he viewed as financial mismanagement and cronyism by Libertarian Party officials. His criticism of the Libertarian Party's misuse of funds and ineffectual strategies often came into conflict with other libertarians, but his expose of financial mismanagement and cronyism is credited, along with the campaign of Michael Badnarik, with saving the Libertarian Party from disaster.

In 1999, Bradford was a founding coeditor of The Journal of Ayn Rand Studies along with Stephen D. Cox and Chris Matthew Sciabarra.

Death
He died of kidney cancer on December 8, 2005 in Port Townsend, Washington, aged 58.

References

External links
 Official site of Liberty magazine
 'Cutting the Gordian Knot' Article on libertarianism by R. W. Bradford
 Liberty Coin Service
 
 Reflection on working with Bradford, by Brian Doherty
 Memoir of Bradford, by Jesse Walker
 Memoir of Bradford and Liberty, by Timothy Virkkala
 Reflection on "Bill Bradford, Ayn Rand, and Coney Island", by Chris Matthew Sciabarra

1947 births
2005 deaths
20th-century American male writers
20th-century American non-fiction writers
21st-century American male writers
21st-century American non-fiction writers
American libertarians
American magazine editors
American male non-fiction writers
American political writers
Consequentialists
Deaths from cancer in Washington (state)
Deaths from kidney cancer
Writers from Detroit
Writers from Port Townsend, Washington